The Tarboro Subdivision is a railroad line owned by CSX Transportation in the U.S. state of North Carolina. At its west end the line continues west from the Rocky Mount Yard and at its east end the line comes to an end.

See also
 List of CSX Transportation lines
 Wilmington and Weldon Railroad

References

CSX Transportation lines
North Carolina railroads